The Boss Baby is a media franchise made by DreamWorks Animation, loosely based on the 2010 picture book of the same name by Marla Frazee. The franchise began with the 2017 film The Boss Baby and has since grown to include a sequel, two television series, and an interactive special.

The franchise's inciting incident is the birth of the titular Boss Baby, later known as Ted, who arrives at 7-year-old Tim's home in a taxi, wearing a suit and carrying a briefcase, the series' timeline spanning to focus on a now 37-year-old Tim's daughters, the 7-year-old Tabitha and new Boss Baby Tina.

Feature films

The Boss Baby (2017)

The Boss Baby is a 2017 American computer-animated comedy film produced by DreamWorks Animation and distributed by 20th Century Fox, following a 7-year-old boy helping his baby brother who is a secret agent in the war for adults' love between babies and puppies.

The film was scheduled for a March 2016 release, but the release date was moved to March 31, 2017. The Boss Baby was released on Digital HD on July 4, 2017, and was released on DVD, Blu-ray, Blu-ray 3D and Ultra HD Blu-ray on July 25, 2017 by 20th Century Fox Home Entertainment. The film features the voices of Alec Baldwin as the title character, along with Miles Bakshi, Steve Buscemi, Jimmy Kimmel, Lisa Kudrow and Tobey Maguire.

The Boss Baby: Family Business (2021)

The Boss Baby: Family Business is a 2021 American sequel to the 2017 The Boss Baby film, again produced by DreamWorks Animation and distributed by Universal Pictures, following the estranged Templeton brothers being reunited by Tim's daughters, one of whom is a new agent from BabyCorp on a mission to uncover the dark secrets behind Tabitha's school and its mysterious founder, Dr. Armstrong.

On May 25, 2017, Universal Pictures and DreamWorks Animation announced that a sequel was set to be released on March 26, 2021, but was delayed to September 17, 2021. The film was moved up to July 2, 2021 and will also stream on Peacock on the same day for free. On May 8, 2020, production was being done remotely during the COVID-19 pandemic. Along with a returning Alec Baldwin, Jimmy Kimmel and Lisa Kudrow, the film features the voices of James Marsden, Amy Sedaris, Ariana Greenblatt, Eva Longoria and Jeff Goldblum.

The Boss Baby 3 (TBA)
During a Q&A with Alec Baldwin and Amy Sedaris in 2021, a third Boss Baby film was announced to be in early development.

Short films

The Boss Baby and Tim's Treasure Hunt Through Time (2017)
The Boss Baby and Tim's Treasure Hunt Through Time is a 2D and 3D animated short film released on July 25, 2017 on The Boss Baby Blu-ray and DVD pack, following Wizzie, the wizard from Tim's alarm clock, as he narrates Tim and Ted's (Boss Baby's) adventures in imagination.

Precious Templeton: A Pony Tale (2021)
Precious Templeton: A Pony Tale is an 2D animated short film released on September 14 on The Boss Baby: Family Business Blu-ray and DVD pack, following a bedtime story to Tina and Tabitha about Precious, the pony Ted gave Tabitha as a lavish gift, who tries to win a carnival talent show from a rival horse, being narrated by Ted himself (reprised by Alec Baldwin).

Television series

The Boss Baby: Back in Business (2018–20)

A computer-animated television series based on the first film, titled The Boss Baby: Back in Business, aired on Netflix between April 6, 2018 and March 16, 2020. A total of 37 episodes were released. The cast featured new voice actors for the characters of Boss Baby (JP Karliak), Tim (Pierce Gagnon), Ted Templeton Sr. (David W. Collins), Janice Templeton (Hope Levy), Jimbo (Kevin Michael Richardson), and Staci (Alex Cazares), while Eric Bell Jr. reprised his role as The Triplets from the film. This series was produced by DreamWorks Animation and distributed by NBCUniversal Television.

The Boss Baby: Back in the Crib (2022–present)

On March 10, 2022, DreamWorks announced a new series and a possible continuation of Back in Business based on the characters from The Boss Baby: Family Business. It was released on May 19, 2022 on Netflix, with JP Karliak (the only actor reprising from Back in Business) reprising his role as the titular character, Ariana Greenblatt (the only actor reprising from Family Business) reprising her role as Tabitha, Max Mittelman replaces Pierce Gagnon from the first series as Tim, and Mary Faber and Krizia Bajos replace Amy Sedaris and Eva Longoria from the second film as Tina and Carol respectively.

Television specials

The Boss Baby: Get That Baby! (2020)
The Boss Baby: Get That Baby!, an interactive special, was released on Netflix on September 1, 2020, featuring the cast of The Boss Baby: Back in Business television series.

The Boss Baby: Christmas Bonus (2022)
The Boss Baby: Christmas Bonus, a Christmas special, was released on Netflix on December 6, 2022, featuring the cast of both The Boss Baby: Back in Business and The Boss Baby: Back in the Crib television series.

Cast and characters
List indicator
 A dark gray cell indicates the character was not featured in the film.
 A  indicates an actor or actress voiced a younger version of their character.

Crew

Additional Crew

Reception

Box office performance

Critical and public response

Chronology
Chronological order of The Boss Baby franchise history:

 The Boss Baby (2017)
 The Boss Baby and Tim's Treasure Hunt Through Time (2017)
 The Boss Baby: Back in Business (2018–20) Seasons 1-3
 The Boss Baby: Get That Baby! (2020)
 The Boss Baby: Christmas Bonus (2022)
 The Boss Baby: Back in Business (2018–20) Season 4
 The Boss Baby: Family Business (2021)
 Precious Templeton: A Pony Tale (2021)
 The Boss Baby: Back in the Crib (2022–present)

References

External links
 

 
Science fiction franchises
DreamWorks Animation franchises
Universal Pictures franchises
Mass media franchises introduced in 2017
American animated fantasy films
Animated film series
Comedy film franchises
Computer-animated films
Children's film series